Bishan is a station on Line 1 of Chongqing Rail Transit in Shuanglong Avenue, Bicheng Subdistrict, Bishan District, Chongqing Municipality, China. The station opened on December 30, 2019. It is CRT's first station to be built outside of the Metropolitan Area of Chongqing.

Connections
The metro station is connected to the northern terminus of the Bishan rubber-tyred tram.

Station Structure

Floors

Line 1 Platform
An island platform is used for Line 1 trains. Line 1 trains can access the Bishan Metro Depot by using the railway junction. The station acts as a reversing station using its scissors crossover for trains to switch direction as their service to Bishan terminates.

Platform Layout

The railway junction is located on the left side of this diagram

Exits
There are a total of 3 entrances/exits for the station.

Future Development
It will be an interchange station between Line 1 and Bitong Line in 2023. Line 27 is also under construction.

References

Railway stations in China opened in 2019
Chongqing Rail Transit stations